The Prosecutor General is the official charged with prosecuting cases at a national level in Hungary. The Prosecutor General is elected by a qualified majority of the parliament to 9-year terms (formerly 6 years), has a fixed office budget, and has no government oversight. The Office of Prosecutor General has evolved into a separate branch of the government of Hungary since 1989.

History and function
The independent pillar status of the Hungarian public accuser's office is a unique construction, loosely modeled on the system Portugal introduced after the 1974 victory of the Carnation Revolution. The public accuser (attorney general) body has become the fourth column of Hungarian democracy only in recent times: after communism fell in 1989, the office was made independent by a new clausule XI. of the Constitution. The change was meant to prevent abuse of state power, especially with regards to the use of false accusations against opposition politicians, who may be excluded from elections if locked in protracted or excessively severe court cases.

To prevent the Hungarian accuser's office from neglecting its duties, natural human private persons can submit investigation requests, called "pótmagánvád" directly to the courts, if the accusers' office refuses to do its job. Courts will decide if the allegations have merit and order police to act in lieu of the accuser's office if warranted. In its decision No.42/2005 the Hungarian constitutional court declared that the government does not enjoy such privilege and the state is powerless to further pursue cases if the public accuser refuses to do so.

List office-holders

Structure

Organizational structure

The prosecutor's bodies of the Republic of Hungary
 National level:
 Office of the General Prosecutor (Army Chief, the Military Appellate Prosecutor's Office, Central Detective Chief)
 regional level:
 Appellate chief prosecution offices
 Territorial Military Prosecutor's Office (General Prosecution power to operate them, covering several counties)
 provincial (municipal) level:
 chief prosecution offices (Public Prosecutor's Investigator)
 local (capital district) level:
 local (District) Public Prosecutors
 The National Institute of Criminology for scientific and research body, the Hungarian Ügyészképző Centre and the profession by training in preparation.

The Supreme Public Prosecutor

The Office of the General Prosecutor is located at the top of the prosecutor's bodies, based in Budapest. Monthly official journal of the Public Prosecutor's Gazette.
The attorney general has the direct supervision of:
 Cabinet Office
 Personnel, Development and Administration Department
 International and European Affairs Department
 International Class Self-Representation
 Department of Legal Self-Representation
 Economic Directorate
 Self-Control Unit
The criminal deputy attorney general has the direct supervision of:
 Detection and Surveillance Department Vádelőkészítési
 Special Affairs Department
 Criminal Affairs Department
 Prison Legal expenses of legal supervision and the Department of Self
 Department of Children and Youth Self-
The Deputy Prosecutor General for civil law and administrative law has the direct supervision of:
 Administrative Law Division
 Department of Private Law
 Computer and Information Division, Employment
 The military is under the direct supervision of Attorney General:
 Department of Military Affairs
 Independent Human Resource and Information Department
 Independent Financial and Accounting Department

References

External links

Government agencies of Hungary
Prosecution
Justice ministers

hu:Ügyészség